Ranil Malcolm Jayawardena (born 3 September 1986) is a British politician who has been a Member of Parliament (MP) for North East Hampshire since 2015. A member of the Conservative Party, he served under Prime Minister Liz Truss as Secretary of State for Environment, Food and Rural Affairs from September to October 2022. He previously served as Parliamentary Under-Secretary of State for International Trade from 2020 to 2022.

Born in London, Jayawardena moved to Hampshire before starting school. His education was at his local comprehensive in North East Hampshire, Robert May's School, followed by Alton College. Jayawardena graduated from the London School of Economics and worked for Lloyds Banking Group, where he became a senior manager.

Early life and career
Jayawardena was born on 3 September 1986 in London, England.  His father, Nalin Jayawardena, is of Sri Lankan origin and moved to the United Kingdom in 1978 to pursue a career in accountancy. His mother, Indira Das Jayawardena, has Indian heritage; he also has a brother and sister. His early education was at Hook Infant School and Hook Junior School in Hook, Robert May's School, a state comprehensive school in the village of Odiham, and Alton College in the town of Alton (all in Hampshire). At the London School of Economics, he graduated with a BSc in Government in 2008. After university, Jayawardena worked for the Lloyds Banking Group and according to The Guardian  was involved in lobbying Members of the European Parliament on imminent legislation affecting the European banking sector. He also worked on a voluntary basis in the office of North East Hampshire MP James Arbuthnot.

Jayawardena served as a councillor of the Borough of Basingstoke and Deane in Hampshire from 2008 to 2015. During his time as a councillor, he was also the Cabinet Member for Finance and Property, before being made Deputy Leader of the council. He invested in "community safety patrollers" to target anti-social behaviour and littering and provided half an hour free parking in "short stay car parks in Top of the Town".

Parliamentary career
James Arbuthnot, the MP for North East Hampshire, indicated in 2011 that he would retire at the next parliamentary election which was due to be held in 2015. Jayawardena was selected in an open primary as the parliamentary candidate for the constituency in 2013. Other short-listed individuals for the seat included future MPs Victoria Atkins and Helen Whately. He went on to be elected as the MP for the constituency at the 2015 general election with 35,573 votes (65.9% share) and a majority of 29,916. This was the largest margin of victory by any Conservative MP in the election. During the election, the candidate for the UK Independence Party was suspended after making a death threat towards Jayawardena.

In his maiden speech, he outlined his belief in the rule of law, in human rights and in equality before the law being matched by equality in opportunity, and that rights must be balanced by responsibilities. In December 2015, he voted to support Prime Minister David Cameron's plans to carry out airstrikes against ISIL targets in Syria. In the 2015–17 parliament, he was part of the Home Affairs Committee and the International Trade Committee. After becoming an MP, he continued to be vocal about local issues that he had supported as a councillor such as protecting weekly bin collections. Jayawardena supported Brexit in the June 2016 United Kingdom European Union membership referendum.

He held his seat in the 2017 general election with 37,754 (65.5%) votes and a majority of 27,772. In June 2017, he shut down his Twitter account after labelling it as "a platform full of trolls, extremists – and worse". After the 2017 election, he was re-appointed to the International Trade Committee and also joined the House of Commons' Procedure Committee.

In January 2018, Jayawardena was made Parliamentary Private Secretary to the ministerial team at the Department for Work and Pensions. In September 2018, he was made Parliamentary Private Secretary to the Ministry of Justice. He resigned from this post on 15 November 2018 in protest at the government's proposed Brexit deal.
In March 2019, Jayawardena was one of 21 MPs who voted against the teaching of LGBT-inclusive relationship and sex education in English schools. He explained his vote as supporting parents' rights to choose their children's education.
Jayawardena supported Boris Johnson in the 2019 leadership election. In the same year, he was appointed as a Vice Chairman of the Conservative Party.

He was re-elected in the 2019 general election with 35,280 votes, a very similar number of votes to 2015 and 2017, but with reduced majority of 20,211 (34.1%) votes. He was appointed Deputy Chairman of the Conservative Party in 2020.

In May 2020, he was appointed as Minister for International Trade, at the Department for International Trade, by Boris Johnson following the resignation of Conor Burns.

In November 2020, the Basingstoke Gazette reported that Jayawardena earned £40,000 in share options from eight days consulting for PepTcell, a pharmaceuticals company and £1,400 plus free travel from Great Western Railway.

In September 2022, he was appointed as Secretary of State for Environment, Food and Rural Affairs by Prime Minister Liz Truss. Jayawardena is considered a close ally of Truss, and was one her earliest supporters during the 2019 leadership election. Farmers Weekly noted at the time that he was "relatively unknown" in agriculture and had no direct experience. He was sworn-in as a member of the Privy Council on 13 September 2022 following his appointment.

Personal life
Jayawardena lives in Bramley, Hampshire. He has been married to Alison (née Roberts), a solicitor, since 2011. The couple have two daughters and a son. His wife works part-time as a Senior Researcher for his parliamentary office. He is a Christian and occasionally goes to church.

References

External links

1986 births
Alumni of the London School of Economics
British politicians of Indian descent
British politicians of Sri Lankan descent
Conservative Party (UK) councillors
Conservative Party (UK) MPs for English constituencies
Councillors in Hampshire
Living people
Sinhalese politicians
UK MPs 2015–2017
UK MPs 2017–2019
UK MPs 2019–present
British Christians
People from Bramley, Hampshire
British Secretaries of State for the Environment
Members of the Privy Council of the United Kingdom